"What U See Is What U Get" is the first single from Xzibit's second album, 40 Dayz & 40 Nightz. In its first week the song peaked at #50 on the Billboard Hot 100, being Xzibit's highest charting single. It peaked at #3 on Hot Rap Singles, his highest on that chart.

Music video
A music video directed by Gregory Dark was filmed in Los Angeles. The deceptively simplistic premise of the video is Xzibit's trek to a nearby shop after being asked to pick up some milk. On his way, Xzibit greets several friends, briefly performs in a local concert and even finds a dropped one hundred-dollar bill. However, he also crosses paths with various chaotic incidents including a carjacking, bombing, shooting, and store looting; all of which he walks past unshaken. In the end, Xzibit is able to pick up the milk and make his way home, only to be told that they also needed hot sauce and asked to go back out again. The video closes with a dedication to then-recently-deceased music video director Michael Lucero. Lucero's production company, What You See Is What You Get(?UC-IS-?U-GET) had produced and Lucero had directed the music videos for Xzibit's songs "Paparazzi" and "The Foundation". The music video peaked at #1 during 6 weeks at BET's Rap City.

Tracks
12"
 "What U See Is What U Get" - 5:09
 "What U See Is What U Get" (instrumental) - 5:09
 "3 Card Molly" - 3:58
 "3 Card Molly" (instrumental) - 3:58
Promo
 "What U See Is What U Get" w/o intro (clean) - 4:21
 "What U See Is What U Get" w/ intro (clean) - 4:31
 "What U See Is What U Get" (LP version) - 5:12
 "What U See Is What U Get" (instrumental) - 5:09

Charts

Peak positions

Year-end charts

References

1998 singles
Xzibit songs
Music videos directed by Gregory Dark
1998 songs
Gangsta rap songs
Loud Records singles
Songs written by Xzibit